Taoyuan Zhongzheng Arts and Cultural Business District is located on the north side of Taoyuan District, Taoyuan City, Taiwan. The total area of Taoyuan Zhongzheng Arts and Cultural Business District is 15.65 hectares. It was designed in the 2000s and developed from the 2010s onward, when Taoyuan City was still Taoyuan County. Taoyuan Zhongzheng Arts and Cultural Business District is one of the prime cultural and central business districts of Taoyuan City. Taoyuan's tallest buildings, such as  ChungYuet Royal Landmark and ChungYuet World Center, are located within this area.

Notable Buildings 
 Taoyuan Arts Center
 ChungYuet Royal Landmark
 Taoyuan Main Public Library
 ChungYuet World Center
 ChungYuet Global Business Building

Transportation

Rail
 Taoyuan Metro
Green Line (under construction): Daxing W. Rd. Intersection and Taoyuan P. Arts Center(TPAC)

Road 
 Taoyuan Interchange
 Southern Taoyuan Interchange

Gallery

See also 
 Xinyi Planning District
 Xinban Special District
 Qingpu Special District
 List of tallest buildings in Taoyuan City
 Urban planning

Notes

References 

Taoyuan District
Zhongzheng
Economy of Taoyuan City
Zhongzheng